Tamil nationalism may also refer to:

 Tamil nationalism (India)
 Sri Lankan Tamil nationalism

Tamil nationalism